In food safety, the concept of substantial equivalence holds that the safety of a new food, particularly one that has been genetically modified (GM), may be assessed by comparing it with a similar traditional food that has proven safe in normal use over time. It was first formulated as a food safety policy in 1993, by the Organisation for Economic Co-operation and Development (OECD).

As part of a food safety testing process, substantial equivalence is the initial step, establishing toxicological and nutritional differences in the new food compared to a conventional counterpart—differences are analyzed and evaluated, and further testing may be conducted, leading to a final safety assessment.

Substantial equivalence is the underlying principle in GM food safety assessment for a number of national and international agencies, including the Canadian Food Inspection Agency (CFIA), Japan's Ministry of Health, Labour and Welfare (MHLW), the US Food and Drug Administration (FDA), and the United Nations' Food and Agriculture Organization (FAO) and  World Health Organization.

Origin
The concept of comparing genetically modified foods to traditional foods as a basis for safety assessment was first introduced as a recommendation during the 1990 Joint FAO/WHO Expert Consultation on biotechnology and food safety (a scientific conference of officials and industry), although the term substantial equivalence was not used. Adopting the term, substantial equivalence was formulated as a food safety policy by the OECD, first described in their 1993 report, "Safety Evaluation of Foods Derived by Modern Biotechnology: Concepts and Principles. The term was borrowed from the FDA's 1976 substantial equivalence definition for new medical devices—under Premarket Notification 510(k), a new Class II device that is essentially similar to an existing device can be cleared for release without further testing. The underlying approach of comparing a new product or technique to an existing one has long been used in various fields of science and technology.

Description
The OECD bases the substantial equivalence principle on a definition of food safety where we can assume that a food is safe for consumption if it has been eaten over time without evident harm. It recognizes that traditional foods may naturally contain toxic components (usually called antinutrients)—such as the glycoalkaloids solanine in potatoes and alpha-tomatine in tomatoes—which do not affect their safety when prepared and eaten in traditional ways.

The report proposes that, while biotechnology broadens the scope of food modification, it does not inherently introduce additional risk, and therefore, GM products may be assessed in the same way as conventionally bred products. Further, the relative precision of biotech methods should allow assessment to be focused on the most likely problem areas. The concept of substantial equivalence is then described as a comparison between a GM food and a similar conventional food, taking into account food processing, and how the food is normally consumed, including quantity, dietary patterns, and the characteristics of the consumer population.

Assessment process
Substantial equivalence is the starting point for GM food safety assessment. It can be applied at different points in the food chain, from unprocessed harvested crop to final ingredient or product, depending on the nature of the product and its intended use. For a GM plant, the overall evaluation process may be viewed in four phases:

Substantial equivalence analysisConsidering introduced genes, newly expressed proteins, and new secondary metabolites
Toxicological and nutritional analysis of detected differencesGene transfer, allergenicity, degradation characteristics, bioavailability, toxicity, and estimated intake levels
Toxicological and nutritional evaluationIf necessary, additional toxicity testing, possibly including whole foods (return to Phase 2).
Final safety assessment of GM plant

Technological developments
There has been discussion about applying new biochemical concepts and methods in evaluating substantial equivalence, such as metabolic profiling and protein profiling.  These concepts refer, respectively, to the complete measured biochemical spectrum (total fingerprint) of compounds (metabolites) or of proteins present in a food or crop.  The goal would be to compare overall the biochemical profile of a new food to an existing food to see if the new food's profile falls within the range of natural variation already exhibited by the profile of existing foods or crops.  However, these techniques are not considered sufficiently evaluated, and standards have not yet been developed, to apply them.

Adoption
Approaches to GM food regulation vary by country, while substantial equivalence is generally the underlying principle of GM food safety assessment. This is the case for national and international agencies that include the Canadian Food Inspection Agency (CFIA), Japan's Ministry of Health, Labour and Welfare (MHLW), the US Food and Drug Administration (FDA), and the United Nations' Food and Agriculture Organization (FAO) and  World Health Organization. In 1997, the European Union established a novel food assessment procedure whereby, once the producer has confirmed substantial equivalence with an existing food, government notification, with accompanying scientific evidence, is the only requirement for commercial release, however, foods containing genetically modified organisms (GMOs) are excluded and require mandatory authorization.

To establish substantial equivalence, the modified product is tested by the manufacturer for unexpected changes to a targeted set of components such as toxins, nutrients, or allergens, that are present in a similar unmodified food.  The manufacturer's data is then assessed by a regulatory agency. If regulators determine that there is no significant difference between the modified and unmodified products, then there will generally be no further requirement for food safety testing. However, if the product has no natural equivalent, or shows significant differences from the unmodified food, or for other reasons that regulators may have (for instance, if a gene produces a protein that has not been a food component before), further safety testing may be required.

Issues

There have been criticisms of the effectiveness of substantial equivalence.

See also
GRAS - Generally Recognized As Safe, an FDA designation

References

Notes

Food safety
Genetically modified organisms in agriculture
Biotechnology